Junior MasterChef Australia (known colloquially as MasterChef Kids) is an Australian competitive cooking game show. It is a spin-off of MasterChef Australia, itself an adaptation of the British show MasterChef, and featured contestants aged 8 to 12. The first season of the show began production in July 2010 and included 50 contestants. Over 5,000 children from around the nation auditioned for the series.

In contrast to prior series, Junior MasterChef Australia was produced by Shine Australia. The promo was seen during the final episode of the second season of MasterChef Australia. The series premiered on Sunday, 12 September 2010.

On 27 April 2020, it was announced that a third season of Junior MasterChef Australia had been commissioned, nine years after the second series aired. Casting was open to children aged between 9 and 14 years old.

Changes
In the Junior series, contestants are not eliminated every week, though four are eliminated at a time once the finalists are decided. Every eliminated contestant receives a range of prizes.

From series 3, casting was extended to children aged between 9–14 years old, as opposed to 8–12 years old.

Hosts and judges

Winners

Series synopses

Season 1 (2010)

Production of a junior version of the show was initially suggested in October 2009. The first series of the show, featuring 8- to 12-year-old contestants, was filmed after the second series of MasterChef Australia and began airing 12 September 2010 on Ten. In contrast to prior series of the main show, Junior MasterChef Australia was produced by Shine Australia. Isabella Bliss won the contest to become Australia's first Junior Masterchef.

Season 2 (2011)
Junior MasterChef was officially renewed on 15 November 2010. Filming started on 28 July 2011, with the season premiering in October 2011.

Matt Moran replaced Matt Preston as a judge and Callum Hann was a guest in the series.

11-year-old Greta Yaxley from Western Australia won the Junior MasterChef title for 2011.

Season 3 (2020)
A revamped third series of Junior Masterchef Australia was announced on 27 April 2020 and is set to air in late-2020, nine years after the second series last aired. Applications for casting were opened on 25 April 2020 for children across Australia aged from 9-14.
Andy Allen, Melissa Leong and Jock Zonfrillo will be returning from the main series to undertake the role of judges in the new season. As of late-July 2020, the program began filming at the Melbourne Showgrounds in Flemington.

The series premiered on 11 October 2020.
 
11-year old Georgia Eris from Victoria won the title with 12-year old Filo from Victoria and 11-year old Carter from New South Wales as the runners up.

Reception

Ratings

International syndications
The network in bold also broadcasts their own version of Junior MasterChef.

References

2010s Australian reality television series
2020s Australian reality television series
2010 Australian television series debuts
2011 Australian television series endings
2020 Australian television series debuts
MasterChef Australia
Television series by Endemol Australia
Television shows set in Sydney
Television shows set in Melbourne
English-language television shows
Australian television spin-offs
Australian television series based on British television series
Australian television series revived after cancellation
Television series about children
Television series about teenagers
Reality television spin-offs